Presentación Urán González (29 May 1956, Madrid) is a Spanish politician and former member of the Spanish Parliament.

Married, with two children, she worked as an administrator before being elected in 1993 as a United Left (IU) deputy for Valencia region and was re-elected again in 1996 and 2000. At the 2004 election, she stood down, although her name appeared on the IU list in fifteenth place  in a district where the party had never won more than two seats. In Congress she was fourth secretary and also served on the New Technologies commission in Congress.

References

External links
profile at the Spanish Congress website

1956 births
Living people
Politicians from Madrid
Members of the 5th Congress of Deputies (Spain)
Members of the 6th Congress of Deputies (Spain)
Members of the 7th Congress of Deputies (Spain)
Politicians from the Valencian Community
United Left (Spain) politicians
21st-century Spanish women politicians
20th-century Spanish women politicians